The 1950 Swedish Ice Hockey Championship was the 27th season of the Swedish Ice Hockey Championship, the national championship of Sweden. Djurgardens IF won the championship.

Tournament

Qualification 
 Ljusne AIK - Kungliga Hälsinge Flygflottilj F-15 Söderhamn 4:3
 Åkers IF - Liljanshof 3:2
 Piteå IF - Wifsta/Östrand 5:2
 BK Forward - Surahammar 3:2
 IFK Bofors - IK Sturehov 9:4
 Tranås AIF - IFK Norrköping 3:5
 IFK Nyland - Leksand 5:3
 Södertälje IF - Traneberg 6:4
 Hagalunds IS - Karlberg 7:2
 Sundbybergs IK - Årsta SK 5:4
 Mora IK - Ljusne AIK 12:3

First round 
 Åkers IF - Södertälje IF 6:3
 IFK Bofors - IFK Nyland 4:0
 Mora IK - Piteå IF 7:5
 IFK Norrköping - BK Forward 5:2
 Hagalund - Sundbyberg 2:3
 IFK Norrköping - Atlas Diesel 3:2

Second round 
 AIK - IFK Norrköping (W)
 Hammarby IF - IK Huge 3:1
 IFK Bofors - Djurgårdens IF 4:11
 Forshaga IF - Åkers IF 8:1
 IK Göta - Nacka SK 2:1
 UoIF Matteuspojkarna - Sundbyberg 4:3
 Gävle GIK - Mora IK 4:5
 Södertälje SK - Västerås SK (W)

Quarterfinals 
 AIK - Hammarby IF 2:3
 Djurgårdens IF - Forshaga IF (W)
 IK Göta - UoIF Matteuspojkarna 4:2 
 Mora IK - Södertälje SK 6:1

Semifinals
 Hammarby IF - Djurgårdens IF 1:3
 IK Göta - Mora IK 3:4

Final 
 Djurgårdens IF - Mora IK 7:2

External links
 Season on hockeyarchives.info

Cham
Swedish Ice Hockey Championship seasons